WWE WrestleMania 21, also known simply as WrestleMania 21 or Wrestlemania XXI, is a professional wrestling video game released exclusively for the Xbox in 2005. It was published by THQ and developed by Studio Gigante based on the WWE pay-per event of the same name. It is also the successor to Raw 2. The game was the last WWE game released on the original Xbox. WWE Wrestlemania 21 was the last game to be released by Studio Gigante.

Gameplay
WWE WrestleMania 21 includes superstars from WWE Raw 2 and new wrestlers, including: Charlie Haas, Jackie Gayda, Lance Cade, René Duprée, Shelton Benjamin, and Eugene. The game features a new reversal system dubbed the Pro Reversal System. This feature allows for simpler functionality with reversing an opponent's move.

Development and release
WrestleMania 21 was first announced by THQ just before E3 2004, stating that the game would be replacing the Raw video game series. Microsoft accidentally sent an older broken version of the game to the disc manufacturer resulting in gamers being unable to connect to the Xbox Live service upon release until a downloadable patch was made available soon thereafter. Because it's now impossible to download the latest update from Xbox Live, the Platimum Hits (silver disc) version contained the latest patch. A number of game breaking bugs and tweaks to the gameplay were fixed.

Reception

Despite an upgrade in visuals, and a fully voiced career-mode, the game was met with very mixed reception due to its gameplay. Rather than being an upgrade of a pre-existing game engine, it was virtually built from the ground up, as well as containing numerous glitches that crippled the gameplay experience. In their review of the game, GameSpot mentioned that the hit detection was horrible. Among various other problems such as a slow and unresponsive AI taking away from the difficulty, or drastically decreasing the length of a match. A Create-a-Wrestler mode lacking a variety of moves, and items for the wrestler being created. While specialty matches are included within the game, they are only playable in 1 on 1. Among other problems, VideoGamer.com mentioned that the game had sloppy controls. IGN gave the game a rating of 6 out of 10, praising the high quality visuals, but like other reviews took issue with the flaws in the gameplay.

See also

List of professional wrestling video games
List of fighting games

References

External links

2005 video games
THQ games
Video games scored by Chris Granner
WrestleMania video games
WWE video games
Xbox games
Xbox-only games
Professional wrestling games
Video games developed in the United States